The Resistance may refer to a resistance movement. It may also refer to:

 The Resistance (American political movement)
 The Resistance (Applegate novel), an Animorphs book
 The Resistance (WildStorm), a WildStorm comic book series
 The Resistance (AWA Studios), an AWA Studios comic book series
 The Resistance (The Fey), a 1998 novel in The Fey Series by Kristine Kathryn Rusch
 The Resistance (film), a 2011 Chinese film
 The Resistance (game), a party game of hidden roles
 The Resistance (Malley novel), a children's novel by Gemma Malley, published in 2008
 The Resistance (series), an American science fiction series
 The Resistance (Spanish TV), a talk show
 The Resistance (Swedish band), a Swedish death metal band formed in 2011
 The Resistance (album), an album by British rock band Muse
 "The Resistance", a song on the studio album New Surrender by the rock band Anberlin

 "The Resistance", a song by Drake

 "The Resistance" a song by American Christian Rock Band, Skillet.

 Battlestar Galactica: The Resistance, a series of Battlestar Galactica webisodes

 The Resistance with Keith Olbermann, an online series hosted by Keith Olbermann

See also
 Resistance (disambiguation)